Josef Gwerder (born 12 January 1939) is a Swiss long-distance runner. He competed in the marathon at the 1968 Summer Olympics.

References

External links
 

1939 births
Living people
Athletes (track and field) at the 1968 Summer Olympics
Swiss male long-distance runners
Swiss male marathon runners
Olympic athletes of Switzerland
Sportspeople from the canton of Schwyz